Kepler-1649 is a red dwarf star of spectral type M5V with a radius , a mass , and a metallicity of -0.15 [Fe/H].

Planetary system
Two confirmed planets orbit the star: Kepler-1649b and Kepler-1649c. Kepler-1649b is similar to Venus, whereas Kepler-1649c is a potentially habitable exoplanet similar to Earth.

References 

M-type main-sequence stars
Kepler objects of interest
Cygnus (constellation)
TIC objects